Worst to First is a Canadian home renovation television series, which debuted on HGTV on September 4, 2017. Hosted by contractors Sebastian Sevallo and Mickey Fabbiano, the series features the duo assisting aspiring homeowners in purchasing and renovating undervalued and outdated homes in the Greater Vancouver area.

The series is produced by Thunderbird Entertainment's Great Pacific Media division.

References

2017 Canadian television series debuts
HGTV (Canada) original programming
2010s Canadian reality television series
Television shows filmed in Vancouver